John Rodriguez (born May 16, 1941) is an American former professional wrestler. He has previously worked as a professional wrestler under the ring name Johnny Rodz.

Professional wrestling career

World Wide Wrestling Federation / World Wrestling Federation (1965–1985)
He was part of the World Wide Wrestling Federation (WWWF) from its early years, appearing on WWWF cards as far back as 1965. He wrestled Bob Backlund in Madison Square Garden while working for the WWWF at the time. Dubbed the "Fire Brand From the Bronx" and the "Unpredictable", he was a proficient worker and a solid heel. Johnny would often tag with Jose Estrada, and Frank "the Gypsy" Rodriguez. For much of the next two decades through mid-1985, Rodz was a mainstay of the federation, though largely used as enhancement talent, for which he was praised by some of his peers. On August 9, 1980, at the Showdown at Shea, he was defeated by "Polish Power" Ivan Putski. His last WWF match was a loss to Gama Singh on June 19, 1985.

NWA Hollywood (1970s)
For a time, he also worked with Mike and Gene LeBell's NWA Hollywood Wrestling in the 1970s. He won a greater share of matches wrestling as "Arabian Wildman" Java Ruuk and even won the promotion's battle royal in 1976.

Post-retirement
In 1996, Rodz was inducted into the WWF Hall of Fame class of 1996 by Arnold Skaaland.

On the March 1, 2007 episode of Total Nonstop Action Wrestling's Impact showed the Latin American Xchange (LAX) attacking Rodz as part of their feud with Team 3D. Ten days later at Destination X, he accompanied Team 3D to the ring for their Ghettobrawl match with LAX at the pay-per-view.

Training
Johnny Rodz has been training students for over 30 years, out of Gleason's Gym in Brooklyn. Rodz has trained many students who have gone on to have successful careers in and out of the ring for various wrestling promotions, serve as high-level executives at television networks, and some even went on to become high level government officials at agencies such as FDA and FDIC. Wrestlers trained by Rodz include: Tazz, Tommy Dreamer, D-von Dudley, Damien Demento, Prince Nana, Marti Belle, Wendy Choo, Big Vito, Masha Slamovich, William Morrissey, Vince Russo, PJ Savage, Cowboy Bad Billy Walker, The Honchos and many more. A few of Rodz' students have gone on to train other future superstars at their own wrestling academies. Rodz founded the independent wrestling promotion known as World of Unpredictable Wrestling.

Wrestlers trained

Vito LoGrasso
Damien Demento
Tommy Dreamer
Big Dick Dudley
Bubba Ray Dudley
D-Von Dudley
Bill DeMott
Elektra
Jason Knight
The Batiri
Vince Russo
Matt Striker
Prince Nana
W. Morrissey
Angel Medina
Tazz
Ricky Vega
S. D. Jones
Marti Belle
Kevin Matthews
Masha Slamovich

Championships and accomplishments
Cauliflower Alley Club
Other honoree (1995)
Lutte Internationale
Canadian International Heavyweight Championship (1 time)
Northeast Championship Wrestling
NCW Heavyweight Championship (1 time, last)
Northeast Championship Wrestling (Tom Janette)
NCW Heavyweight Championship (2 times)
World Wrestling Council
WWC World Tag Team Championship (2 times) - with Super Medico I
WWC North American Tag Team Championship (2 times) - with Super Médico I
WWC Caribbean Heavyweight Championship (1 time)
WWC Caribbean Tag Team Championship (3 times) - with Super Médico I
World Wrestling Federation
WWF Hall of Fame (Class of 1996)

References

External links
WWE Hall of Fame Profile of Johnny Rodz
World of Unpredictable Wrestling

1938 births
American male professional wrestlers
20th-century African-American sportspeople
21st-century African-American people
African-American male professional wrestlers
Living people
Professional wrestlers from New York (state)
Professional wrestling promoters
Professional wrestling trainers
WWE Hall of Fame inductees
20th-century professional wrestlers
Professional wrestlers from New York City